Signal transducer and activator of transcription 5B is a protein that in humans is encoded by the STAT5B gene. STAT5B orthologs have been identified in most placentals for which complete genome data are available.

Function 

The protein encoded by this gene is a member of the STAT family of transcription factors. In response to cytokines and growth factors, STAT family members are phosphorylated by the receptor associated kinases, and then form homo- or heterodimers that translocate to the cell nucleus where they act as transcription activators. This protein mediates the signal transduction triggered by various cell ligands, such as IL2, IL4, CSF1, and different growth hormones. It has been shown to be involved in diverse biological processes, such as TCR signaling, apoptosis, adult mammary gland development, and sexual dimorphism of liver gene expression. This gene was found to fuse to retinoic acid receptor-alpha (RARA) gene in a small subset of acute promyelocytic leukemias (APML). The dysregulation of the signaling pathways mediated by this protein may be the cause of the APML.

Interactions 

STAT5B has been shown to interact with:
 Glucocorticoid receptor,
 Janus kinase 1, 
 Janus kinase 2,  and
 PTPN11.

See also 
 STAT5

References

Further reading